"Can It Be All So Simple" is the third and final single from Wu-Tang Clan's critically acclaimed debut album Enter the Wu-Tang (36 Chambers). It features production from RZA (credited as Prince Rakeem) that samples Gladys Knight & the Pips' cover of "The Way We Were". The song reached number nine on the Hot Dance Music/Maxi-Singles Sales chart, number twenty four on the Hot Rap Tracks chart and number eighty two on the Hot R&B/Hip-Hop Singles & Tracks chart.

"Can It Be All So Simple" features rapping from Ghostface Killah and Raekwon. Its lyrics deal with a glorified mafioso lifestyle. In the song, Raekwon and Ghostface discuss the hardships of growing up in New York City during the 1980s, and how they want to live a lavish and famous lifestyle to escape the hardships of life. The music video was directed by Hype Williams, with images similar to the song's content and a cameo by MC Eiht.

A remix with new lyrics can be found on Raekwon's debut album Only Built 4 Cuban Linx.... Additionally, Lauryn Hill's "Ex-Factor" uses the break beat from "Can It Be All So Simple".

Song order

Original 
 Intro: RZA and Raekwon
 First verse: Raekwon
 Chorus: Raekwon and Ghostface Killah
 Second verse: Ghostface Killah

Remix 
 Intro: Raekwon and Ghostface Killah
 First verse: Ghostface Killah
 Chorus: Raekwon and Ghostface Killah
 Second verse: Raekwon
 Outro: Raekwon and Ghostface Killah

Track listing

A-side 
 "Can It Be All Be So Simple" (Radio Edit) – (4:19) 
 "Can It Be All So Simple" (Album Version) – (4:43) 
 "Can It Be All So Simple" (Instrumental) – (5:03)

B-side 
 "Wu-Tang Clan Ain't Nuthing ta F' Wit" (Radio Edit) – (3:36) 
 "Wu-Tang Clan Ain't Nuthing ta F' Wit" (Album Version) – (3:36) 
 "Wu-Tang Clan Ain't Nuthing ta F' Wit" (Instrumental) – (3:31)

References

1993 songs
1994 singles
Wu-Tang Clan songs
Song recordings produced by RZA
Music videos directed by Hype Williams
Hardcore hip hop songs
Loud Records singles
Songs written by Ghostface Killah
Songs written by Raekwon
Songs written by RZA